Love Nature is a Canadian-based specialty television channel. The channel broadcasts documentaries and television series related to wildlife and nature.

The channel's Canadian operations are owned solely by Blue Ant Media, while the international operations are jointly owned by Blue Ant Media, Rock Entertainment Holdings and Smithsonian Networks.

History

As Oasis HD

In August 2005, John S. Panikkar (co-founder of the channel's original owner, High Fidelity HDTV), was granted a licence by the Canadian Radio-television and Telecommunications Commission (CRTC) to launch OasisHD, described as "a national English-language Category 2 high definition specialty programming undertaking... featuring urban and wild landscapes by Canadian and international cinematographers."

The channel launched in Canada on March 12, 2006, as Oasis HD, focusing on wildlife and nature programming, similar to its current format.

On December 21, 2011, High Fidelity HDTV announced that it had entered into an agreement to be purchased outright by Blue Ant Media. While initially purchasing 29.9% of the company, the remaining 70.1% would be purchased once it is approved by the CRTC.

In the summer of 2014, the channel dropped the "HD" moniker and was re-branded as Oasis with a revised logo and new website.

On January 19, 2015, Oasis re-branded again, this time as Love Nature. The re-branding coincided with an announcement by Blue Ant Media that it planned to produce 200 hours of nature programming per-year in 4K Ultra HD.

Makeful replaced BiteTV on August 24, 2015 and it became a sister station to Makeful as with other Blue Ant channels.

International expansion
On July 14, 2008, then owners High Fidelity HDTV, announced that it had reached an agreement with Cameron Thomson Group to distribute then Oasis HD, throughout Europe. Although the channel did not launch internationally as planned.

On December 14, 2015, Blue Ant Media and Smithsonian Networks jointly announced that it was partnering in a new joint venture called Blue Skye Entertainment, with the new company focusing on developing and distributing 4K Ultra HD wildlife and nature programming globally via SVOD and linear television services under the Love Nature brand and Smithsonian Network's stand-alone streaming service, Smithsonian Earth. The new company's first product launch came with the launch of the Love Nature SVOD streaming service, which launched in 32 countries at launch, in February 2016.

The channel's first international linear television distribution agreement was signed with StarHub TV in Singapore in November 2016.

The channel launched on Virgin Media on channels 293 and 294 in the United Kingdom on 21 July 2018. They were removed from Virgin Media on 4 December 2020. Most of the programmes that aired on the channel moved to Sky Nature.

The channel launched on Ziggo on channel 205 in the Netherlands on 1 February 2019.

The channel launched on MyTV SUPER on channels 402 and 403 in Hong Kong on 11 March 2019, available in HD and 4K formats.

The channel launched on Unifi TV on channel 502 in Malaysia and channel 746 in the United States on 15 January 2020, available in HD and 4K formats.

The channel launched on AIS Play on channel 505 in Thailand on 1 August 2020, available in HD and 4K formats.

The channel launched on SkyCable on Channel 192 in Philippines on March 28, 2022 available soon in HD format.

The channel launched on Astro in Malaysia on 15 January 2023, available in HD (Channel 558) and 4K (Channel 549). The HD Version later soon moved to channel 550 on 1 February 2023.

The channel launched on Amazon Freevee in the USA on 22 October 2022, included with an Amazon Prime Membership.

References

External links
 
 
 
 

Blue Ant Media channels
Digital cable television networks in Canada
Television channels and stations established in 2006
English-language television stations in Canada
Video on demand services
Television channels in the Netherlands